Jeff S. Korek is a New York City-based trial lawyer and partner at Gersowitz Libo & Korek, a personal injury law firm. He is a past president of the New York State Trial Lawyers' Association and former commentator on  Court TV.

Korek was selected to SuperLawyers and to Best Lawyers in America for the years 2006-2022. He received Best Lawyers “Lawyer of the Year, Personal Injury Litigation – Plaintiffs, NYC" for 2016 and "Lawyer of the Year, Medical Malpractice Law - Plaintiffs, NYC" for 2020. He was also included in New York Magazine’s New York's Best Lawyers from 2006-2023. He was admitted to the New York and New Jersey state bars and the United States District Court for both Southern and Eastern Districts of New York in 1986. Korek was admitted to the bar for the United States Supreme Court in 2013.

Career
After graduating from the Maurice A Deane School of Law at Hofstra University, Korek worked as a chauffeur, receptionist and file clerk for F. Lee Bailey and Aaron J. Broder. Korek was admitted to the New York bar in 1986.

Korek joined Gersowitz Libo & Korek in 1992. He previously worked for Weitz & Luxenberg and Leahey and Johnson.

In 2006, Korek served as the president of the New York City chapter of the American Board of Trial Advocates. He also served as president of  the New York State Trial Lawyers Association from 2007-2008. Korek was 45 at the time of his election as president of the NYSTLA, making him the youngest president in the association’s history.

Prior to becoming president of the New York State Trial Lawyers Association, Korek served as that body’s first vice president.

Korek also serves on the Committee on Character and Fitness for the Ninth Judicial District, Second Judicial Department of the State of New York. The committee examines state bar applicants to ensure they are fit to practice law in the state of New York.

Education
Korek has an undergraduate degree from State University of New York at Binghamton. He received his juris doctor from the Maurice A Deane School of Law at Hofstra University.

References

External links
 

New York (state) lawyers
Living people
Year of birth missing (living people)